Events in the year 2022 in Slovakia.

Incumbents 
 President: Zuzana Čaputová
 Prime Minister: Eduard Heger

Events 
Ongoing — COVID-19 pandemic in Slovakia
 8 February - Thousands of Slovaks protest in Bratislava against a potential military defense treaty between Slovakia and the United States. Police prevented some protesters from entering the National Council building, where the bill is being debated by lawmakers.
 19 February - The Slovakia men's hockey team wins their first medal at the Winter Olympics after defeating Sweden in the men's tournament.
 14 March - Slovakia expels three Russian diplomats for alleged espionage and bribery.
 16 June - Four people are killed and five others are injured in a building fire in the town of Handlova.
 30 June - Slovakia measures the highest ever temperature in June in Somotor near Košice, reaching 38.8 °C (101.8 °F).
 7 July - Slovakia reports its first case of monkeypox. 
 9 August - Russia's Transneft says that Ukraine has suspended Russian oil flows through the Druzhba pipeline to the Czech Republic, Hungary and Slovakia after it was unable to pay transit fees to Ukraine's pipeline operator UkrTransNafta.
 12 October - 2022 Bratislava shooting two people were killed and another person was wounded in a shooting in Bratislava. The shooting took place in front of the Tepláreň café, which is a well-known spot frequented by the Bratislava LGBT community.

Deaths 
 4 January – Carl Linhart, baseball player (b. 1929)
 2 February - László Szigeti, politician (b. 1957)
 7 February - Ivan Hudec, politician (b. 1947)
 10 February - Eduard Kukan, politician (b, 1939)
 12 February - Ivan Reitman, film director (b. 1946)
 20 February - Ivan Matušík, architect (b. 1930)
 13 March - Ľubomír Roman, actor (b. 1944)
 27 March - Titus Buberník, footballer (b. 1933)
 14 June - Ondrej Rigo, serial killer (b. 1955)
 7 July - Max Eisen, author (b. 1929)
 10 July - Ján Solovič, playwright and politician (b. 1934)
 30 July - Yitzchok Tuvia Weiss, rabbi (b. 1926)
 8 August - Jozef Tomko, Roman Catholic cardinal (b. 1924)
 31 August - Alexander Horváth, footballer (b. 1938)
 1 September - Ľudovít Komadel, Olympic swimmer (b. 1927)
 8 September - Ľubomír Dobrík, judge (b. 1952)
 14 October - Stanislav Kropilák, basketball player (b. 1955)
 25 October - Branislav Hronec, composer (b. 1940)
 9 November - Ivan Čarnogurský, politician (b. 1933)
 5 December - Mária Kráľovičová, actress (b.1927)
 10 December - Soňa Valentová, actress (b. 1946)
 12 December - Anton Šoltýs, Olympic Alpine Skier (b. 1937)
 18 December - Hilda Augustovičová, actress (b. 1934)
 19 December - Rudolf Vraniak, basketball player (b. 1931)
 20 December - Vladimír Krčméry - physician (b. 1960)
 22 December -
 Irena Greifová, costume designer (b. 1939)
 Anton Tkáč, racing cyclist (b. 1951)
29 December - Miroslav Číž, politician (b. 1954)
30 December - Miklós Duray, politician (b. 1945)

References 

 
Slovakia
Slovakia
2020s in Slovakia
Years of the 21st century in Slovakia